The 2011 Major League Soccer All-Star Game, held on July 27, 2011, was the 16th annual Major League Soccer All-Star Game, a soccer match involving all-stars from Major League Soccer. The MLS All-Stars faced Manchester United of the English Premier League for the second year running in the eighth MLS All-Star Game to feature international opposition. Manchester United won the game 4–0 with goals from Anderson, Park Ji-Sung, Dimitar Berbatov and Danny Welbeck.

The game was played at the Red Bull Arena in Harrison, New Jersey, making it the first MLS All-Star Game to be played in the New York metropolitan area since 1997.

Rosters

MLS All-Stars
	

♦

♦ 
♥
†
† 
♠ 
♥
♥
♥
♥
†
♥

♦ – Players selected by MLS Commissioner Don Garber
† – Injured and unavailable for matchday
♠ – Unavailable due to FC Dallas playing in the CONCACAF Champions League match the same week of the All Stars game
♥ – "Inactive Roster" players voted for by other players in MLS

Manchester United

Match

Details

References

2011
Manchester United F.C. matches
Soccer in New Jersey
All-Star Game
2011 in sports in New Jersey
Harrison, New Jersey
Sports competitions in New Jersey
July 2011 sports events in the United States